Alice Claypoole Vanderbilt (November 11, 1845 – April 24, 1934) was the wife of Cornelius Vanderbilt II and reigned as the matriarch of the Vanderbilt family for over 60 years.

Early life and relatives
Alice Claypoole Gwynne was born on November 11, 1845, in Cincinnati, Ohio. Alice, who was also raised in Cincinnati, was a daughter of lawyer Abraham Evan Gwynne and his wife, Rachel Moore Flagg. After her father's death in 1855, her mother remarried to Albert Mathews, who wrote under the name Paul Siogvolk. Alice's siblings included David Eli Gwynne, Abram Evan Gwynne, Cettie Moore (née Gwynne) Shepherd, and Edith Olivia (née Gwynne) Gill.

She was a granddaughter of Henry Collins Flagg, a former mayor of New Haven, Connecticut, and a great-great-granddaughter of Major Ebenezer Flagg, who served in the 1st Rhode Island Regiment during the American Revolution and was killed in action in 1781. Her maternal uncles were George Whiting Flagg, a painter, and Jared Bradley Flagg, a real estate developer and also a painter. Through Jared Flagg, she was a first cousin of architect Ernest Flagg.

Alice was from an old Rhode Island family and among her ancestors was Roger Williams, who founded the State of Rhode Island, and Samuel Ward Sr., a former Rhode Island Governor. Many Flagg family members are buried in Newport's Island Cemetery. Alice's affection for Newport reflected this association of her earliest colonial ancestors with the city.

Marriage and children

While teaching Sunday school at St. Bartholomew's Episcopal Church in New York City, she met Cornelius Vanderbilt II, the eldest son of William Henry Vanderbilt and Maria Louisa Kissam.  They were married on February 4, 1867, at the Church of the Incarnation on Madison Avenue in New York.

Together, they were the parents of four sons and three daughters:

 Alice Gwynne Vanderbilt (1869–1874), who died young.
 William Henry "Bill" Vanderbilt II (1870–1892), who died of typhoid fever while a student at Yale University.
 Cornelius "Neily" Vanderbilt III (1873–1942), who was disinherited for marrying Grace Graham Wilson against his parents' wishes.
 Gertrude Vanderbilt (1875–1942), who married Harry Payne Whitney. She was an artist who founded the Whitney Museum.
 Alfred Gwynne Vanderbilt (1877–1915), a businessman who died aboard the RMS Lusitania.
 Reginald Claypoole Vanderbilt (1880–1925), an avid equestrian.
 Gladys Moore Vanderbilt (1886–1965), who married Count László Széchenyi.

Later life
Alice Vanderbilt's husband died of a cerebral hemorrhage on September 12, 1899, in their New York home at 1 West 57th Street.  His estate at the time of his death was appraised at $72,999,867 (equivalent to $ in  dollars), $20 million of which was in real estate.

Alice lived another 35 years until her death on April 22, 1934, in her home at 857 Fifth Avenue in Manhattan, where she had moved after the 1926 sale of the 57th Street mansion (which was then demolished).

Her youngest child, Countess Széchenyi, inherited both the massive summer "cottage" (The Breakers in Newport) and the New York townhouse at 857 Fifth Avenue (the former residence of George Jay Gould). Gertrude received the proceeds from the sale of 1 West 57th Street, totaling $7,000,000.

Real estate

Alice was responsible for constructing several massive family houses, including the enlargement of 1 West 57th Street, making it the largest private residence ever built in an American city at the time. She also played a role in constructing The Breakers in Newport.

In 1914, she was responsible for the construction of the Gwynne Building in Cincinnati, Ohio, site of the first shop of Procter & Gamble and later the company's headquarters.  After her death, her son Neily received ownership of the Gwynne Building.

Philanthropy
Alice donated to various charitable causes. Throughout her life, she was a large supporter of the YMCA, Salvation Army, Red Cross, Trinity Church and St. Bartholomew's Church.  She and her husband donated Vanderbilt Hall to Yale College in memory of their eldest son, Bill, a student there when he died in 1892. She gave the front gates of her former mansion at 1 West 57th Street to be placed in Central Park. She also donated a facility to Newport Hospital in 1903 in memory of her late husband.

Descendants
Through her son Alfred, Alice was the grandmother of William Henry Vanderbilt III, Alfred Gwynne Vanderbilt Jr., and George Washington Vanderbilt III.

Through her youngest son Reginald, Alice was the grandmother of Cathleen Vanderbilt and Gloria Vanderbilt, the socialite and fashion designer, and the great-grandmother of news anchor Anderson Hays Cooper and his late brother, Carter Vanderbilt Cooper.

References

External links

 Vanderbilt, Alice Gwynne (1845–1934) at encyclopedia.com

1845 births
1934 deaths
American socialites
Gilded Age
People from Cincinnati
People included in New York Society's Four Hundred
Philanthropists from New York (state)
Alice Claypoole
Burials at the Vanderbilt Family Cemetery and Mausoleum